SiraTone was a brand of electronic outdoor warning sirens produced by Federal Signal Corporation which began production in the early 1980s. These sirens were designed to broadcast high-intensity warning signals over a large area. SiraTone products are/were used for natural disaster notification, HAZMAT incident notification, fire call systems, and more. The SiraTone product line is no longer in production. The product line was succeeded by the Modulator and DSA (Directional Speaker Array) electronic outdoor warning sirens.

Products

Six models of outdoor warning sirens were produced under the SiraTone brand. Model numbers were designated by the lettering EOWS (Electronic Outdoor Warning Siren) and an asterisk, followed by a number representative of the respective siren's decibel output or speaker array setup. All models utilized re-entrant speaker horns, arrays of 100 watt speaker drivers, and produced six standard signals.

 EOWS* 115 – The first SiraTone model produced; a 1200 Watt omnidirectional siren with 12 rectangular Atlas CJ-46 speaker horns  
 EOWS* 1212 – 1200 Watt omnidirectional siren; an updated version of the EOWS* 115, with 12 circular Atlas DR-42 speaker horns
 EOWS* 408 – 800 Watt rotating siren with 4 circular Atlas DR-42 speaker horns.   
 EOWS* 612 – 1200 Watt rotating siren with 6 circular Atlas DR-42 speaker horns. The 612 was the most produced model of the SiraTone series.
 EOWS* 812 – 1200 Watt rotating siren, with 8 circular Atlas DR-42 speaker horns; was discontinued and succeeded by the EOWS* 612. 

There was also a mobile vehicle-mounted version, at one time, called the EOWS* M12.

Signals

The sirens were able to produce these tones:

 Alert - A steady siren tone
 Attack - A wailing siren tone
 Alternating Steady - An siren tone alternating between a high and low frequency, at half-second intervals, akin to a typical European emergency vehicle siren. 
 Alternating Wail - Attack tone, with high and low tones alternating at half-second intervals.
 Pulsed Wail - Pulsating wailing tone, alternating at half-second intervals.
 Pulsed Steady - Pulsating steady tone, at half-second intervals.
 An auxiliary tone of choice
Whoop - Winding up and then winding up again and again with a pulse.
Westminster Chimes - Chimes on the Siratone controller for tests.
 
A unique feature of the SiraTone siren series was the ability to conduct routine tests with a Westminster Chime melody instead of an actual alarm tone, intended to be a more pleasant alternative to the use of actual alarm tones. This allowed for operators to test sirens without fear of public panic and still ensure siren speakers were fully functional. Various other signals could be added upon special request.

Gallery

References

External links

Sound production
Sirens